Animal Mother is the tenth album by Today Is the Day, released on October 21, 2014 by Southern Lord Records.

Background
Most of the album's material was written in response to the deteriorating mental and physical health, and the death of, Steve Austin's mother. Austin has described the album as being about human relationships between family and friends. The title Animal Mother was chosen for the record because Austin considered the two words to be polar opposites of each other, which he felt matched the overall theme of the album.

The album was first announced in November 2013 on the band's facebook page, in that announcement he also mentioned that the album's lineup will include bassist Sean Conkling and drummer  Jeff Lohrber. The band was signed to Southern Lord Records in June 2014, and the album was released on October 21 of that same year on CD and LP formats. The LP edition of the album removed "Bloodwood" from the track list, in its place is a cover of The Melvins' "Zodiac", from their 1991 album Bullhead. The band's bandcamp page included a version of the album, on digital formats, with both "Bloodwood" and "Zodiac" in the track list. An edition of 100 hand numbered vinyl copies of the album were sold through the band's bandcamp page, all copies were signed by the band. An edition of 400 orange copies were made exclusive for European retailers. There's also an unknown amount of oxblood-orange colored copies made available.

To promote the album, music videos were produced for the tracks "Masada", "Heathen", and "Animal Mother". The band also toured twice, with their intended third tour being cancelled due to a van accident that broke Austin's ribs in his back and his left side. However, he recovered from his injuries five months after the accident and a third tour was set in motion. Before the accident, Today Is the Day were touring with Eyehategod, Iron Reagan, and Power Trip.

Inside the liner notes for the album is a quote that reads "the woods are lovely, dark, and deep, but I have promises to keep, and miles to go before I sleep, and miles to go before I sleep", which is a direct reference to the 1977 film Telefon.

Track listing

Personnel 
Adapted from the Animal Mother liner notes.

Today Is the Day
 Steve Austin – vocals, guitars, keyboards, electronics
 Sean Conkling – bass, electronics
 Jeff Lohrber – drums

Production and design
 Steve Austin – production, recording, mixing, mastering
 Marc Ablasou – electronics (5, 11)
 Samantha Muljat – cover art, design

Release history

References

External links 
 
 Animal Mother at Bandcamp

2014 albums
Southern Lord Records albums
Today Is the Day albums